Alkalibacterium subtropicum is a slightly halophilic and alkaliphilic bacterium from the genus Alkalibacterium.

References

Lactobacillales
Bacteria described in 2011